KVOO-FM (98.5 MHz) is a commercial radio station in Tulsa, Oklahoma.  The station is owned by Griffin Communications and it airs a country music radio format.  In 1988, the FM station picked up the heritage call sign and country format from its AM sister station (now KTSB).  The studios are on North Boston Avenue in downtown Tulsa.

KVOO-FM has an effective radiated power (ERP) of 100,000 watts, the maximum for most stations in the U.S.  The transmitter is on Oklahoma State Highway 97 in the Osage Reservation, north of Sand Springs, Oklahoma.  KVOO-FM is licensed by the FCC to broadcast in the HD Radio format.

History
Its call letters were KBJH, and it aired a Christian radio format. The station was started by evangelist Billy James Hargis and his initials were part of the call sign. The station's license was held by the American Christian College, founded by Hargis.

In 1976, the call letters were changed to KCFO-FM. The station called itself "Love 98 FM" and it played Contemporary Christian music.  Salem Communications owned KCFO AM-FM at that time.  It decided to focus on large and major markets and sold KCFO-FM to the Stuart family in 1987.  The Stuarts also owned KVOO 1170 AM, which was a full service country station, with personalities, news and sports.  KCFO-FM flipped to a more-music country sound, first as KUSO "US-98.5" and later as "Country 98" KVOO-FM, using the same call letters as the heritage AM station.  The Stuart Family sold the stations to Great Empire Broadcasting in 1990.

Journal Communications (KVOO-FM's former owner) and The E.W. Scripps Company (owner of Tulsa's NBC network affiliate KJRH-TV) announced on July 30, 2014, that the two companies would merge to create a new broadcast company under the E.W. Scripps Company name.  The new firm would own the two companies' broadcast properties, including KVOO-FM.

On June 26, 2018, parent company E.W. Scripps announced that it would sell KVOO, along with its sister stations, KBEZ, KFAQ, KHTT, and KXBL, to Griffin Communications. Griffin began operating the stations under a local marketing agreement (LMA) on July 30, and completed the purchase October 1.  The company already owned CBS affiliate KOTV-DT and CW affiliate KQCW-DT.

On December 7, 2020, at Noon, KVOO-FM rebranded as "98.5 The Bull".

Previous logo

References

External links
 98.5 The Bull Website
Journal Broadcast Group

Country radio stations in the United States
VOO-FM
Radio stations established in 1973
1973 establishments in Oklahoma
Griffin Media